William Deaver House is a historic home located near Pisgah Forest, Transylvania County, North Carolina.  It was built about 1832, and is a two-story, heavy timber frame Georgian style dwelling.  It is sheathed in weatherboard and has a gable roof. The front facade features a double-gallery engaged porch.

It was listed on the National Register of Historic Places in 1979.

References

Houses on the National Register of Historic Places in North Carolina
Georgian architecture in North Carolina
Houses completed in 1832
Houses in Transylvania County, North Carolina
National Register of Historic Places in Transylvania County, North Carolina